Stäubli (in English usually written as Staubli) is a Swiss mechatronics company, primarily known for its textile machinery, connectors and robotics products.

History
Stäubli was founded in Horgen, Switzerland in 1892 as "Schelling & Stäubli" by Rudolph Schelling and Hermann Stäubli as a workshop specialized in producing dobbies. In 1909, the company opened a new manufacturing site in Faverges, Haute-Savoie, France. After the death of Rudolph Schelling in the same year, the company was renamed to "Gebrüder Stäubli" ("Stäubli Bros.")

In 1956, the company diversified its line of products into the field of hydraulics and pneumatics and commenced the production of rapid action couplings. The Connectors' division was born. In 1969, they acquired the German dobby producer Erich Trumpelt (founded 1954 in Bayreuth) and changed the company name to "Stäubli & Trumpelt". In 1982 the company diversified again, this time into automation and robotics. In 1983, they acquired French competitor Verdol SA and established "Stäubli - Verdol SARL" in Lyon-Chassieu, France.

In 1989, Stäubli took over American competitor Unimation from Westinghouse, including their British division located in Telford, UK. In 1994, they took over Zellweger Weaving Systems in Sargans, Switzerland. In 2002 Stäubli acquired a majority stake in Multi-Contact, a leading provider of electrical connectors, which became "Stäubli Electrical Connectors" in 2017. In 2004, they acquired German competitor Bosch Rexroth's robotics division and incorporated their products into their own product line. In 2007 the Stäubli Group acquired a stake in the Italian electronic engineering company DEIMO.

Divisions

Since its foundation in 1892, Stäubli has expanded into three different lines of products and services:
 Stäubli Textile is the division of the company's original field of products and has since expanded into multiple countries.  It manufactures dobbies and similar products related to textile weaving, including shedding systems, Jacquard machines, carpet weaving machines and weaving preparation systems.
 Stäubli Connectors manufactures quick, single and multi-connector systems used for all types of fluids, gases and electrical power, as well as robot tool changers and quick mold change systems.
 Stäubli Robotics is Stäubli's automation and robotics related division founded in 1982. It produces SCARA and 6-axis robots for industrial automation, including controllers and software.

Company overview
With a workforce of 5500, the Stäubli Group generates a yearly turnover of 1.3 billion Swiss francs (CHF). The company has 14 industrial production sites as well as presence through business units and agents in 50 countries. Production sites include: Allschwil,  Bayreuth, Carate Brianza, Chemnitz, Duncan, South Carolina, Essen, Faverges, Hangzhou, Hésingue, Lyon, Sargans and Weil am Rhein.

References

Manufacturing companies of Switzerland
Robotics companies
Textile machinery manufacturers
Manufacturing companies established in 1892
Multinational companies headquartered in Switzerland
Industrial robotics
Swiss brands
Swiss companies established in 1892